Hanson Peak  is a small peak,  high,  south of Cape Adare in the northern part of Adare Peninsula, Antarctica. It was named by the New Zealand Antarctic Place-Names Committee  after Nicolai Hanson, a member of the British Antarctic Expedition 1898–1900, under C.E. Borchgrevink, who was the first man known to have died on the Antarctic mainland (at Cape Adare, October 14, 1899, where his grave is located).

References

Mountains of Victoria Land
Borchgrevink Coast
One-thousanders of Antarctica